The Party Wall etc. Act 1996 introduced a procedure for resolving disputes between owners of neighbouring properties, arising as a result of one owner's intention to carry out works which would affect the party wall, involve the construction of a party wall or boundary wall at or adjacent the line of junction between the two properties or excavation within certain distances of a neighbour's structure and to a lower depth than its foundations.

The provenance of the 1996 Act can ultimately be traced back to 1666, when The Great Fire of London gave rise to a radical re-think of party wall construction to restrict the spread of fire between adjacent properties in the future.  Until the introduction of the Act, there was no set procedure in England and Wales for dealing with such a frequent occurrence, and this often led to expensive litigation to resolve quite straightforward matters.  In Inner London however, Part VI of the London Building Acts (Amendment) Act 1939 set out a well tried and tested mechanism for resolving disputes, having evolved over numerous previous enactments of that legislation since the mid nineteenth century.  The Party Wall etc. Act 1996 is essentially a re-working of the 1939 Act, albeit with certain modifications to improve some anomalies in the Part VI procedure and general updating of the text.

External links 
 The Party Wall etc Act 1996: explanatory booklet, on the website of the Department for Communities and Local Government

See also

 Party wall surveyor
 Pyramus and Thisbe Club

United Kingdom Acts of Parliament 1996